Millpu (Quechua for "throat, gullet", also spelled Millpo) is a mountain in the Andes of Peru, about  high. It is situated south of the Huayhuash mountain range. Its main peak and the northern peak are located in the Lima Region, Cajatambo Province, Cajatambo District, south of Puka Qaqa and a lake named Quyllurqucha.

See also 
 Pumarinri

References

Mountains of Peru
Mountains of Lima Region